Mairie des Lilas is a station of the Paris Métro in the commune of Les Lilas and serves as the northern terminus of line 11. It is named after the town hall of Les Lilas. A small underground depot is located near the station to service the trains of line 11. The station is sometimes believed to be the subject of the Serge Gainsbourg song "Le Poinçonneur des Lilas", about a Métro ticket inspector, although the promotional film for it was filmed at the Porte des Lilas.

History 
The station opened as part of the extension of the line from Porte des Lilas on 17 February 1937. As part of the "Un métro + beau" programme by the RATP, the station's platform lighting was modernised during the course of the 2000s while the corridors were renovated 28 June 2018.

As part of modernization works for the extension of the line to Rosny-Bois-Perrier in 2023 for the Grand Paris Express, the station will be closed from 26 June 2021 to 29 August 2021 to raise its platform levels, its surface tiled, and to widen and lengthen the tunnels at the end of the station. This is to accommodate the new rolling stock that will be used (MP 14) to accommodate the expected increase in passengers and to make it accessible to people with reduced mobility. 2 new entrances will also be added with the one at Place du Colonel-Fabien having 2 lifts.

In 2019, the station was used by 4,436,148 passengers, making it the 101st busiest of the Métro network out of 302 stations.

In 2020, the station was used by 2,563,685 passengers amidst the COVID-19 pandemic, making it the 82nd busiest of the Métro network out of 305 stations.

Passenger services

Access 
The station has 2 entrances:

 Entrance 1: rue de Paris
 Entrance 2: Boulevard de la Liberté

Station layout

Platforms 
The station has a standard configuration with 2 tracks surrounded by 2 side platforms, although the lower part of the walls are vertical instead of a typical elliptical shape.

Other connections 
The station is also served by lines 105, 129, 515 (TillBus), and P'tit Bus of the RATP bus network, and at night, by lines N12 and N23 of the Noctilien bus network.

Gallery

References

Roland, Gérard (2003). Stations de métro. D’Abbesses à Wagram. Éditions Bonneton.

Paris Métro stations in Les Lilas
Railway stations in France opened in 1937